The Bus may refer to:

Arts and entertainment
 The Bus (TV series), a reality television show format started in Netherlands
 The Bus (video game), a bus simulation game by TML-Studios
 "The Bus", an episode of the American television series Without A Trace
 "The Bus", also an episode of the American television series M*A*S*H
 The Bus, a comic strip by Paul Kirchner, originally published in Heavy Metal magazine
 "The Bus", 1965 documentary by Haskell Wexler that follows a group of Freedom Riders

People

 Jerome Bettis, former National Football League player nicknamed "The Bus"
 Julian Savea New Zealand rugby player nicknamed "The Bus"
 Va'aiga Tuigamala, rugby player nicknamed "The Bus"

Public transportation
 TheBus (Honolulu) public transportation in Honolulu, Hawaii.
 TheBus (Prince George's County) bus system serving Prince George's County, Maryland
 TheBus (Hernando County, Florida)
 TheBus public transportation operated by Cornwall Transit in Cornwall, Canada
 The Bus public transportation system operated by the Marble Valley Regional Transit District in Rutland County, Vermont

See also
Bus (disambiguation)

Lists of people by nickname